"No End in Sight" is a debut song co-written and recorded by American country music artist Katrina Elam.  It was released in July 2004 as the first single from the album Katrina Elam.  The song reached #29 on the Billboard Hot Country Singles & Tracks chart.  The song was written by Elam, Robin Lee Bruce and Christi Dannemiller.

Chart performance

References

2004 debut singles
2004 songs
Katrina Elam songs
Songs written by Robin Lee Bruce
Songs written by Katrina Elam
Show Dog-Universal Music singles